Kurt Blumenfeld (May 29, 1884 – May 21, 1963) was a German-born Zionist from Marggrabowa, East Prussia. He was the secretary general of the World Zionist Organization from 1911 to 1914. He died in Jerusalem.

He had served as secretary of the Zionist Federation of Germany from 1909 to 1911 and later served as president of that organization from 1924 to 1933, when he fled the rising tide of antisemitism in Nazi Germany for Palestine, after they had searched his Berlin home. He was a good friend of Hannah Arendt. Blumenfeld opposed the Anti-Nazi boycott saying “The boycott harms German Jews first and foremost. The boycott has no favorable results for us.”

He died in Jerusalem, Israel in 1963 at the age of 79.

Works 

 Kurt Blumenfeld und Hans Tramer: Erlebte Judenfrage. Ein Viertel-Jahrhundert deutscher Zionismus. Stuttgart 1962
 Im Kampf um den Zionismus. Briefe aus fünf Jahrzehnten. Stuttgart 1976
 Hannah Arendt und Kurt Blumenfeld: ... in keinem Besitz verwurzelt. Die Korrespondenz, hrsg. von Ingeborg Nordmann und Iris Pilling, Hamburg 1995,

References

Bibliography 

 
 
 Laqueur. History of Zionism. p. 156.

1884 births
1963 deaths
People from Olecko
Jewish emigrants from Nazi Germany to Mandatory Palestine
German Zionists
People from East Prussia